SAS Nagar Mohali railway station is the main railway station in Sahibzada Ajit Singh Nagar district in Punjab. It serves Mohali, the city adjacent to Chandigarh of the Indian state of Punjab.

The railway station

History

The 112 km-long project for linking  and Ludhiana directly was completed in three phases. The first phase linking Chandigarh and New Morinda on the Sirhind–Nangal line was opened in September 2006. The second phase for the addition of third line between Sahnewal and Ludhiana on the Ambala–Attari line was completed in November 2012. The third phase linking New Morinda with Ludhiana was completed in April 2013.

Electrification

The –Ludhiana sector is electrified. As per the Central Organisation for Railway Electrification, as on 1.4.2012, 43 km had been completed and 69 km were left.

References

External links

Ambala railway division
Buildings and structures in Mohali
Railway stations in Sahibzada Ajit Singh Nagar district